is a passenger railway station  located in the city of Inzai, Chiba Prefecture Japan, operated by the East Japan Railway Company (JR East).

Lines
Kobayashi Station is served by the Abiko Branch Line of the Narita Line, and is located 18.3 kilometers from the terminus of the branch line at Abiko Station.

Layout
The station is an elevated station boult above dual opposed side platforms. The station is staffed.

Platforms

History
Kobayashi Station was opened on April 1, 1901 as a station on the Narita Railway Company for both freight and passenger operations. On September 1, 1920, the Narita Railway was nationalised, becoming part of the Japanese Government Railway (JGR).  After World War II, the JGR became the Japan National Railways (JNR). Scheduled freight operations were suspended from November 1, 1961. The station was absorbed into the JR East network upon the privatization of the Japan National Railways (JNR) on April 1, 1987.

Passenger statistics
In fiscal 2019, the station was used by an average of 1,953 passengers daily (boarding passengers only).

Surrounding area
 
Kobayashi Middle School

See also
 List of railway stations in Japan

References

External links

  JR East station information 

Railway stations in Japan opened in 1901
Railway stations in Chiba Prefecture
Narita Line
Inzai